Sci Fi in Poland was launched on December 1, 2007. Today, it is available through satellite and cable television.

Unlike NBCUniversal's other science fiction channels around the world, the Polish channel maintained the "Sci Fi" brand on October 14, 2010. The term "syfy" has negative connotations in Polish, because it is a plural form of the word syf 'dirt, syphilis', which is why they chose to become Sci Fi rather than "Syfy".

Programming
Angel
Battlestar Galactica
Buffy the Vampire Slayer
Dark Angel
Charmed
Dead Like Me
Eureka
Firefly
Futurama
Flash Gordon
Legend of the Seeker
Quantum Leap
Star Trek: Enterprise
Stargate SG-1
Stargate Atlantis
Stargate Universe
Sci Fi Universal original programmes

References

External links
Official website

Syfy
Television channels in Poland
Television channels and stations established in 2007
Science fiction television channels

pl:Sci Fi Universal